Naoko Matsumoto is a Professor in the Department of Archaeology at Okayama University. Her research covers the areas of cognitive archaeology, gender archaeology and the Jomon period.

Education 
In 1998 she received a received her D.Litt.  from Kyushu University.

Career 
Matsumoto has excavated at several Jomon and Yayoi sites in the Kyushu and Chugoku districts of western Japan. She is on the Advisory Committee for the Shanghai Archaeology Forum.

Selected publications 
 Matsumoto, N. 2018. Changing relationship between the dead and the living in Japanese prehistory. Philosophical Transactions of the Royal Society B: Biological Sciences. 373, 1754, 20170272
 Matsumoto, N. 2018. Japan: The Earliest Evidence of Complex Technology for Creating Durable Coloured Goods. Open Archaeology. 4, 1, p. 206-216.
 Matsumoto, N., Bessho, H. and Tomii, M. (eds) 2011. Coexistence and Cultural Transmission in East Asia. Left Coast Press.

References 

Japanese archaeologists
Japanese women archaeologists